Obion County is a county located in the northwest corner of the U.S. state of Tennessee. As of the 2020 census, the population was 30,787. The county seat is Union City. The county was formed in 1823 and organized in 1824. It was named after the Obion River.

Obion County is part of the Union City, TN–KY Micropolitan Statistical Area, which is also included in the Martin–Union City, TN Combined Statistical Area.

History
In the year, 1811 there was a large seismic activity located on the New Madrid Fault Line. The series of earthquakes, while devastating, formed Reelfoot Lake.

Obion was later established in 1823 and organized the following year. It was named for the Obion River, which flows through the county and is a tributary of the nearby Mississippi River. The word "Obion" is believed to be derived from a Native American word meaning "many forks," or from an Irish trapper named O'Brien.

The founding of Obion County originally came from the expansion of railroads. The county has since moved towards many agricultural and manufacturing productions.

In 2013, Discovery Park of America opened in Union City. Discovery Park is a 50-acre encyclopedic museum and heritage park with exhibits pertaining to local and national history, military history, art, science, and technology.

Geography
It is located in the "rolling hills of northwest Tennessee".

Adjacent counties
Fulton County, Kentucky (north)
Hickman County, Kentucky (northeast)
Weakley County (east)
Gibson County (southeast)
Dyer County (southwest)
Lake County (west)

National protected area
Reelfoot National Wildlife Refuge (part)

State protected areas
Glover Wetland Wildlife Management Area
Gooch Wildlife Management Area
Hop-In Refuge
Obion River Wildlife Management Area (part)
Reelfoot Lake State Natural Area (part)
Reelfoot Lake State Park (part)
Three Rivers Wildlife Management Area

Major highways

Demographics

2020 census

As of the 2020 United States census, there were 30,787 people, 12,717 households, and 8,389 families residing in the county.

2000 census
As of the census of 2000, there were 32,450 people, 13,182 households, and 9,398 families residing in the county. There were 14,489 housing units at an average density of 27 per square mile (10/km2). The racial makeup of the county was 88.16% White, 9.85% Black or African American, 0.19% Asian, 0.14% Native American, 0.05% Pacific Islander, 0.91% from other races, and 0.71% from two or more races.  1.90% of the population were Hispanic or Latino of any race.

There were 13,182 households, out of which 31.00% had children under the age of 18 living with them, 56.40% were married couples living together, 11.10% had a female householder with no husband present, and 28.70% were non-families. 25.70% of all households were made up of individuals, and 12.10% had someone living alone who was 65 years of age or older.  The average household size was 2.42 and the average family size was 2.89.

In the county, the population was spread out, with 23.40% under the age of 18, 8.40% from 18 to 24, 27.70% from 25 to 44, 25.40% from 45 to 64, and 15.20% who were 65 years of age or older.  The median age was 39 years. For every 100 females, there were 93.40 males.  For every 100 females age 18 and over, there were 89.90 males.

The median income for a household in the county was $32,764, and the median income for a family was $40,533. Males had a median income of $32,963 versus $20,032 for females. The per capita income for the county was $17,409.  About 10.10% of families and 13.30% of the population were below the poverty line, including 18.60% of those under age 18 and 15.10% of those age 65 or over.

Politics

The county is part of District 77 of the Tennessee House of Representatives, currently represented by Republican Rusty Grills, and District 76, currently represented by Republican Tandy Darby. The county is part of District 24 of the Tennessee Senate, currently represented by Republican John Stevens. At the federal level, it is part of the state's 8th congressional district, currently represented by Republican David Kustoff.

Education

Obion County Schools
School District website

Union City Schools
School District Website

Attractions 

Obion County is home to many attractions and activities.

 Discovery Park of America offers a world-class educational experience that focuses on nature, science, technology, history, and art. Discovery Park is the main source of tourism to Obion County. 
 Reelfoot Lake is a protected area in Obion County. It is an oasis for hiking, boating, and experiencing nature. 
 Masquerade Theatre is a local theater groups and presents many high-quality productions. What started as the historical Capitol Theater has now been renovated to meet the community's needs.
 The Obion County Fair is one of the biggest events held in the county. Fair Rides, Agricultural displays, pageants, and much more are held in late August every year.

Media
WENK-AM 1240 "The Greatest Hits of All Time"
WWGY 99.3 "Today's Best Music with Ace & TJ in the Morning"
WQAK-FM 105.7 "The Quake" (alternative rock)
The Union City Daily Messenger The county's Newspaper since 1926

Other services
Obion County has a public library, with a  building and a catalog of over 70,000 books, video and audio materials.

Residents of the county's unincorporated communities have the option of paying $75 per year if they want firefighting services from the city of South Fulton.

Communities

Cities
South Fulton
Union City (county seat)
Woodland Mills

Towns

Hornbeak
Kenton (partly in Gibson County)
Obion
Rives
Samburg
Trimble (mostly in Dyer County)
Troy

Unincorporated communities
Cunningham
 Dixie
Midway
 Protemus
Walnut Log

See also
National Register of Historic Places listings in Obion County, Tennessee

References

External links

 Obion County Joint Economic Development Council – joint initiative of the Obion County Chamber of Commerce and the Obion County Industrial Development Council
 Obion County, TNGenWeb - free genealogy resources for the county

Obion County Schools
Union City Schools

 
Union City, Tennessee micropolitan area
1824 establishments in Tennessee
Populated places established in 1824
West Tennessee